is a Japanese manga series written and illustrated by Kengo Hanazawa. It has been serialized in Kodansha's Weekly Young Magazine since July 2018. An anime television series adaptation by Tezuka Productions is set to premiere in October 2023.

Plot 
The ninja organization in Japan, which once flourished, was dismantled by the GHQ after the Pacific War and disappeared. However, the ninja still exist in secret, and it is said that there are 200,000 of them living in Japan today, hiding and working in the dark in the public and private sectors and in all kinds of organizations. While some of the elite ninja work behind the scenes in national level conflicts, the ninja at the end of the line are often unable to find work. One of them, Kuro Kumogakure, who is living the life of a NEET, receives a serious "ninja assignment," an order from his superiors to infiltrate a high school with the latest equipment.

Media

Manga
Under Ninja, written and illustrated by Kengo Hanazawa, started in Kodansha's seinen manga magazine Weekly Young Magazine on July 23, 2018. Kodansha has collected its chapters into individual tankōbon volumes. The first volume was released on February 6, 2019. As of January 6, 2023, nine volumes have been released.

In North America, Denpa announced the English language release of the manga in July 2020.

Volume list

Anime
On September 6, 2021, it was announced that the series would receive an anime television series adaptation. It is produced by Tezuka Productions and directed by Satoshi Kuwabara, with scripts supervised by Keiichirō Ōchi, character designs by Nobuteru Yūki, and music composed by Shōta Kowashi. The series is set to premiere in October 2023 on TBS.

References

External links
  
  
 

2023 anime television series debuts
Anime series based on manga
Kodansha manga
Ninja in anime and manga
Seinen manga
TBS Television (Japan) original programming
Tezuka Productions
Upcoming anime television series